Paris Saint-Germain Football Club was founded in August 1970 after the merger of Paris Football Club and Stade Saint-Germain. PSG made an immediate impact, winning promotion to Division 1 and claiming the Division 2 title in their first season. Their momentum was soon checked, however, and the club split in 1972. Paris FC remained in the top flight, while PSG were administratively relegated to Division 3. Following back-to-back promotions, PSG quickly returned to the premier division in 1974 and moved into the Parc des Princes.

The club's first trophies arrived in the 1980s. Steered by players such as Safet Sušić, Luis Fernandez and Dominique Rocheteau, the Parisians claimed two consecutive French Cup titles in 1982 and 1983 followed by their maiden league championship in 1986, after which they went into decline. But a takeover by television giants Canal+ in 1991 revitalised PSG. Led by David Ginola, George Weah and Raí, the club won nine trophies and reached five consecutive European semi-finals during the 1990s. Most notably, Paris claimed a second league title in 1994 and its crowning glory, the UEFA Cup Winners' Cup in 1996 with legend Luis Fernandez now as coach.

At the start of the 21st century, the Red and Blues struggled to rescale the heights despite the magic of Ronaldinho and the goals of Pauleta. Five more trophies arrived in the form of three French Cups, one French League Cup and one UEFA Intertoto Cup, but the capital side became better known for lurching from one high-profile crisis to another. As a result, Canal+ sold the club to Colony Capital in 2006. The situation, however, only got worse and PSG spent the 2006–07 and 2007–08 campaigns staving off relegations.

The fortunes of Paris Saint-Germain changed dramatically when Qatar Sports Investments (QSI) purchased the club in 2011. Since then, Paris have spent heavily on the signings of world-class players such as Zlatan Ibrahimović, Thiago Silva, Edinson Cavani, Ángel Di María and, most notably, Neymar and Kylian Mbappé, the world's two most expensive transfers in football history. As a result, PSG have dominated French football, winning 27 trophies: seven league titles, six French Cups, six French League Cups and eight French Super Cups. They have also become a regular in the knockout stages of the Champions League, reaching the final for the first time ever in 2020.

Early years (1970–1973)

Paris + Saint-Germain

In the summer of 1970, an ambitious group of businessmen decided to create a major team in the French capital. Guy Crescent and Pierre-Étienne Guyot chose to merge their virtual side, Paris FC, created in 1969, with Stade Saint-Germain of Henri Patrelle after the team from Saint-Germain-en-Laye, 15km west of Paris and founded in 1904, won promotion to Division 2. However, the three men were stuck with the financial feasibility of the project until they met Real Madrid president Santiago Bernabéu. He told them that starting a crowdfunding campaign was the best solution to establish a new team. 20,000 people backed the project and Paris Saint-Germain were formed on June 17, 1970. Guyot was elected the club's first president a few days later. For the first time in French football history, the fans had financially contributed in the making of a club.

The merger was made official following the creation of the club's association on August 12, 1970. Paris Saint-Germain retains this day as their foundation date. Red, blue and white were adopted as the club's traditional colours. The red and blue represent the city of Paris, while the white is a symbol of French royalty and stands for the nearby royal town of Saint-Germain-en-Laye, the birthplace of French King Louis XIV.

Paris FC contributed with the financial backing, while Stade Saint-Germain provided the sporting infrastructure, from the Division 2 status to the Camp des Loges training center, as well as the manager Pierre Phelipon and most of the players, including Bernard Guignedoux, Michel Prost and Camille Choquier. In addition to becoming PSG's first manager ever, Phelipon was also one of only two player-managers in the history of the club.

Top-flight debut and split

Paris Saint-Germain further strengthened their squad with the signing of Jean Djorkaeff, captain of the France national team. PSG's first official game was a 1–1 league draw away to Poitiers on August 23, 1970. Guignedoux scored the club's first ever goal from a free-kick. The club went on to clinch promotion to Division 1 and claim the Division 2 title in its inaugural season.

PSG's first top-flight season ended with a safe 16th place, meaning they would stay in Division 1 next year, but behind the scenes the club was in a delicate financial situation. Back in September 1971, the Paris City Council offered 850k francs to pay the club's debt and save its place in the elite, demanding PSG in return to adopt the more Parisian name "Paris Football Club." Coincidence or not, PSG suffered their biggest defeat ever in all competitions on that same month. It was a crushing 0–6 loss away to Nantes.

Guy Crescent, who had replaced Pierre-Étienne Guyot as club president before the start of the season, was in favor of the name change, but Henri Patrelle was against it. The disagreement led to Crescent's resignation in December 1971, handing the presidency to Patrelle. The latter tried to persuade the council to reconsider their position, but they remained inflexible and the club split on June 1, 1972, a few days after the last match of the campaign. Backed by the council, Crescent re-formed Paris FC and remained in Division 1, while the PSG of Patrelle were administratively relegated to Division 3, thus losing professional status.

Start from scratch in Division 3

Bound by professional contracts with Paris FC, most of the club's players, including team captain Jean Djorkaeff and Bernard Guignedoux, continued playing in Division 1, while manager Pierre Phelipon departed following the expiration of his contract. Only Camille Choquier, Patrice Py, Jean-Louis Leonetti, Bernard Béréau and Jean-Louis Brost stayed with PSG in 1972–73. The club took the spot of its reserve team in Division 3 and rebuilt their squad with many upcoming players from the Paris Saint-Germain Academy.

Led by new manager Robert Vicot, Paris Saint-Germain began life in the third tier with a young but talented squad that would star in the club's forthcoming back-to-back promotions. Some of these gifted youngsters included Éric Renaut, Othniel Dossevi, Michel Marella, Jacques Laposte and, most notably, Christian André, the main architect of the rise to Division 2 thanks to his 27 goals in 35 games. The Red and Blues finished second in Group West, six points behind Quevilly, missing out on promotion by little. Quevilly, however, had to dissolve due to financial problems shortly after the end of the season and PSG took their place in Division 2 by default.

Daniel Hechter years (1973–1978)

Return to Division 1

Paris Saint-Germain really took flight with the arrival of fashion designer Daniel Hechter as chairman of the management committee in June 1973. Besides offering his financial support to the club, he also designed the team's classic home outfit. Hechter then shocked the national game ahead of 1973–74 by appointing French legend Just Fontaine as sporting director and signing several prestigious players, including Jean-Pierre Dogliani, Jean Deloffre, Louis Cardiet and Jacky Bade.

Robert Vicot's men finished second in Group B, four points behind Red Star, qualifying for the promotion play–offs against Valenciennes. The winner of this double-legged match would be promoted to Division 1. PSG lost 1–2 away to Valenciennes, but PSG recorded an incredible 4–2 comeback at the Parc des Princes, thus achieving promotion and regaining its professional status abandoned two years earlier. Overwhelmed by emotion, Fontaine collapsed on the lawn, victim of a heart attack. Fortunately, he recovered and was carried by the players in celebration. Since then, PSG have always played in the first tier of French football.

PSG played their first game at the Parc des Princes during this campaign. It was against fellow Parisian side Red Star on November 10, 1973. PSG won 3–1 and Othniel Dossevi scored the club's first goal at the stadium. The Parisians also began their tradition of brilliant Coupe de France runs, reaching the quarterfinals after beating Metz at the Parc in front of 25,000 spectators (2–1; 4–1 on agreggate). There, they were ousted by Reims on a 2–7 aggregate that included the club's largest cup defeat ever (0–5).

Parc des Princes move and cup joy

In an ironic turn of events, Paris FC were relegated to Division 2 at the same time as Paris Saint-Germain moved up to the top flight in 1974, leaving their home stadium, the Parc des Princes, in the hands of their estranged Parisian brothers. Since then, the Parc has been the home of PSG. Before that, PSG had been playing at several grounds including the Stade Municipal Georges Lefèvre, the Stade Jean-Bouin, the Stade Bauer, the Stade Yves-du-Manoir and even the Parc a few times despite the reluctance of Paris FC.

With promotion to Division 1 also came a change of command. Daniel Hechter, then chairman of the management committee, took over as club president in June 1974 following the resignation of Henri Patrelle. He named Francis Borelli as vice-president. Hechter immediately opened his checkbook once again, signing Algerian virtuoso Mustapha Dahleb from Sedan for a then French transfer record 1.3 million francs in July 1974. In spite of the great partnership created by Dahleb and fellow attacker François M'Pelé (50 goals between them), PSG were still far from challenging for the league title in 1974–75, finishing in a lowly 15th place.

The club's French Cup performance was the high point of the season. PSG brushed aside Sochaux 5–0 on aggregate in the last 16 to set up an epic duel with Marseille in the quarterfinals. Played amidst a hostile atmosphere, the Red and Blues visited the Stade Vélodrome as massive underdogs. OM comfortably led by two goals until, out of the blue, M'Pelé scored twice to revive PSG's hopes of qualification (2–2). Angered by the result, Marseille fans attacked the PSG team bus after the final whistle. M'Pelé believes this cup game is the true origin of the rivalry between both clubs. In the second leg, PSG won 2–0 and qualified for the semifinals, a first for a Parisian club since Stade Français in 1965, before narrowly bowing out to Lens.

Ambitious signings, underwhelming results

Despite an ambitious recruitment in 1975–76, including the signings of well-established players like Humberto Coelho and Jean-Pierre Tokoto, the league campaign ended in an underwhelming 14th place marked by the divorce between manager Just Fontaine and captain Jean-Pierre Dogliani. Fontaine, formerly the club's sporting director, had replaced Robert Vicot early in the season and then stripped Dogliani of the captain's armband. On the bright side, PSG reached the French Cup quarterfinals for the third season in a row.

In the pre-season, Daniel Hechter relaunched the Tournoi de Paris, a friendly competition originally created in 1957 by Racing Paris. Reinforced with Dutch legend Johan Cruyff and Serbian star Dragan Džajić for the occasion, PSG narrowly lost to Spanish side Valencia in the final in front of a sold-out Parc des Princes. Additionally, the club inaugurated the first center of the Paris Saint-Germain Academy in November 1975 at the Camp des Loges. François Brisson, Jean-Marc Pilorget, Lionel Justier and Thierry Morin were part of the center's maiden generation. They all made their professional debuts as starters in a 2–3 league defeat to Reims at the Parc des Princes on in December 1975.

A new chapter began in 1976–77; club's talisman Jean-Pierre Dogliani retired, while former Serbian player Velibor Vasović replaced Just Fontaine. The first foreigner to sit on the PSG bench, Vasović arrived to the French capital with the goal of playing European football next season. But, even with Mustapha Dahleb's exceptional goalscoring form (26 goals), the Parisians finished in 9th place following a disastrous start to the campaign. Having failed to qualify for Europe, Vasović resigned near the end of the season. Daniel Hechter named former PSG goalkeeper Ilija Pantelić as manager for the last four league matches, registering two wins and two draws.

Jean-Michel Larqué, who had recently hung up his boots to become the new PSG manager in 1977–78, was quickly forced to put them back on to fill the void left by the failed transfer of Lyon playmaker Serge Chiesa. Larqué was the club's second and last player-manager to date, the other being Pierre Phelipon. For all the star signings, including Argentinian striker Carlos Bianchi and defenders Jean-Pierre Adams and Ramón Heredia, the season was a disappointing one as PSG finished in 11th place. Carlos Bianchi, for his part, was the top scorer in Division 1 with 37 goals in 38 matches. He was the last big transfer of Daniel Hechter.

In January 1978, Hechter was banned for life from football by the French Football Federation for running a ticketing scheme at the Parc des Princes. PSG beat Marseille 5–1 in his final match at the stadium as club president on January 8. Mustapha Dahleb offered Hechter the match ball after the final whistle and was then carried in triumph by the players while the fans in attendance chanted his name. The next day, Francis Borelli, who had been vice-president until then, became the new president.

Francis Borelli years (1978–1991)

Climbing the league table

In spite of a disappointing first season, the club gave Jean-Michel Larqué a vote of confidence in 1978–79, signing France national team mainstays Dominique Baratelli and Dominique Bathenay with the hope that PSG would finally get closer to the top of the league table. But the campaign was once again a failure. In August, following a catastrophic start to the season, Larqué stepped down to focus on his playing role at the club.

Pierre Alonzo took over until early November 1978, when he surprisingly resigned. His replacement, Velibor Vasović, had not yet arrived and PSG visited Monaco for a league match on November 4. Club president Francis Borelli named the starting lineup that day. This is the only time that PSG have played an official game without a manager on the bench. Paris lost 1–2. Carlos Bianchi managed a second consecutive Division 1 top scorer title, before switching 13th-placed Paris for French champions Strasbourg. François M'Pelé also left the club with an impressive goal tally of 97, including a club record 28 strikes in the French Cup.

Velibor Vasović's second stint in Paris got off to a promising start in 1979–80. PSG signed Portuguese maestro João Alves and recorded their best debut to a league campaign since 1974, picking up a draw away to Lyon and a home win over Marseille in their first two matches. But the club's fortunes soon turned sour. A week after his stellar performance against Marseille, Alves suffered a near career-ending injury at Sochaux in August 1979, which sidelined him for five months. Alves returned at the start of 1980 but never fully recovered his previous form.

Then, PSG lost their manager in early October 1979. Vasović was forced to resign following pressure from coach union UNECATEF and its president Guy Roux because he did not have the official diplomas to coach in France. Former PSG goalkeeper Camille Choquier took over until the end of the month. He managed three matches, winning two and losing one, before Georges Peyroche arrived to the French capital in November 1979. Against all odds, Peyroche excelled and led PSG to a 7th-place finish, the club's best ever league ranking at the time.

PSG transferred João Alves to Benfica in 1980–81, but signed Saint-Étienne winger Dominique Rocheteau, who joined to play as center forward. Led by an attacking trio made up of Rocheteau himself, Nambatingue Toko and Boubacar Sarr, with Mustapha Dahleb pulling the strings from the number 10 position, PSG managed their most promising season so far. The Red and Blues finished 5th in the league, narrowly missing out on European football but establishing themselves as a top-half team with Georges Peyroche at the helm. Despite being eliminated on away goals, another highlight was the club's anthology French Cup victory against Nantes at the Parc des Princes (5–3).

First major trophy: the Coupe de France

Georges Peyroche made a few tweaks to the team in 1981–82 with the signings of Raymond Domenech, Michel N'Gom, Daniel Sanchez but above all Yugoslav star Ivica Šurjak. The Parisians mounted a challenge for a European spot via the Division 1, but fell short towards the end of the season with a 7th-place finish. They secured, however, another shot at it by reaching the club's first French Cup final. There were nearly 150,000 requests for only 46,160 seats available at the Parc des Princes to see PSG go up against the great Saint-Étienne of Michel Platini, who was playing his last match in France before leaving for Juventus.

Nambatingue Toko opened the scoring for PSG in the 58th minute following a good cross from Ivica Šurjak. Saint-Étienne reacted and Platini equalized in the 78th minute to send the game to extra-time. Platini then doubled his personal account, giving the Greens the lead in the 99th minute. The Parc des Princes faithful no longer believed in their team when Dominique Rocheteau, after yet another assist from Šurjak, scored an unexpected equalizer against his former team in the last seconds of the match.

PSG fans then invaded the field in joy, while club president Francis Borelli kneeled and kissed the lawn of the Parc. Following an interruption of 30 minutes, the penalty shootout sealed PSG's coronation. Dominique Baratelli stopped Saint-Étienne's last attempt and Jean-Marc Pilorget scored the winning penalty for the capital side. Twelve years into existence, PSG had won their first major title in their home stadium. This success opened PSG the doors to Europe for the first time, qualifying for next season's European Cup Winners' Cup.

European debut and second French Cup title

Paris Saint-Germain were the first Parisian club to play in Europe since the 1960s, when Racing Paris and Stade Français participated in the Inter-Cities Fairs Cup. The expectation was huge for 1982–83 and PSG strengthened their squad with European Golden Shoe winner Kees Kist, 1978 FIFA World Cup champion Osvaldo Ardiles and, most notably, Yugoslav wizard Safet Sušić, who remains to this day one of the club's greatest players ever. They joined an already well-rounded workforce featuring experienced players Dominique Bathenay, Dominique Baratelli, Dominique Rocheteau, Mustapha Dahleb and Nambatingue Toko as well as promising PSG Academy graduates Luis Fernandez, Jean-Claude Lemoult and Jean-Marc Pilorget.

The Red and Blues made their European debut away to Lokomotiv Sofia in the first round of the European Cup Winners' Cup. They lost 0–1 in Bulgaria, but played champagne football at home to win 5–1 with Toko scoring a superb half volley that sealed PSG's qualification. Following a comfortable victory over Swansea City, the quarter-final draw appeared to be perfect as Paris avoided top teams like Real Madrid, Barcelona, Bayern Munich or Inter Milan. The first leg against Belgian Cup winners Waterschei was the club's first major European meeting, reflected in the 49,575 fans present at the Parc, their all-time attendance record. PSG deservedly won 2–0 with a great performance from Fernandez, who scored the first goal. The result could have been larger, though, a fact they would regret. In the return leg, Paris lost 0–3 after extra time and were knocked out in a highly controversial match that saw them finish with nine men.

On the domestic scene, results were just as satisfying. PSG PSG captured their first podium finish, coming in 3rd place, and repeated the feat in the 1983 Coupe de France Final, this time against Nantes. Recently crowned French champions, the Canaries were headed for the league-cup double, leading at the break after overturning Pascal Zaremba's early strike. But PSG managed their own comeback in the second half as Sušić equalized and then assisted Toko for the winning goal (3–2), once again qualifying for the Cup Winners' Cup. The campaign ended on a sad note, though, as Georges Peyroche left the club to take a sabbatical year.

Maiden league crown

Playing in the European Cup Winners' Cup for the second season in a row in 1983–84, Paris faced Northern Irish minnows Glentoran in the first round, winning 4–2 on aggregate to meet the Juventus of Michel Platini. It was the first time PSG clashed against a big European club as well as the first of several memorable games against the Italian team. Led by star player Safet Sušić, they rose to the occasion, drawing both matches and only bowing out on away goals to the eventual winners. PSG were really close to eliminating Juve in the return leg in Turin, with a free-kick from Sušić hitting the post and Jean-Marc Pilorget missing a clear chance just before the final whistle.

PSG, however, struggled for domestic form under manager Lucien Leduc. The double title holders of the Coupe de France were eliminated at the first hurdle and, then, a bad run towards the end of the campaign saw Leduc resign as Paris face the prospect of missing out on European football. Replaced by Georges Peyroche, back following ten months of absence, PSG recovered and defeated Toulouse on the final game of the championship. Sušić's goal, the only one of the match, secured 4th place for Paris, synonym of UEFA Cup action next season.

Deprived of legend Mustapha Dahleb, who left after ten years at the club, Paris experienced a difficult 1984–85 campaign. Georges Peyroche was sacked by Francis Borelli in March 1985 due to poor results, but his replacement, Christian Coste, could not steady ship and PSG finished the league in 13th place. The Red and Blues still managed to reach the 1985 Coupe de France Final, its third in four years. This time, however, PSG lost to Monaco (0–1). They were also shocked by surprise finalists Videoton in the second round of the UEFA Cup. The capital club lost both matches, the first of them a blushing 2–4 defeat at the Parc des Princes. As usual, Safet Sušić provided the highlight of the season by assisting five goals in PSG's 7–1 home win over Bastia in September 1984, a club record that still stands today.

A little over a year after the cup loss to the principality side, Paris conquered France under Gérard Houllier's guidance, who had taken over from Christian Coste. PSG were crowned league champions for the first time in their history in 1985–86, much to the joy of their growing fanbase in the Kop of Boulogne stand. Boulogne Boys, the club's first ultra group and one of their most famous supporters' groups ever, were founded in 1985.

Paris Saint-Germain dominated the championship from start to finish thanks in big part to the likes of Joël Bats, Dominique Bathenay, Luis Fernandez, Dominique Rocheteau and Safet Sušić, all of whom made up the backbone of the team. The victory away to Toulouse on Matchday 3 meant PSG sat at the top of the table for the first time ever, a spot they never relinquished, going a memorable 26 matches without defeat towards the title. It had been 50 years since a Parisian club had won the league. The last to do so were Racing Paris in 1935–36. PSG were also close to claiming the league-cup double, only just crashing out of the French Cup semifinals to eventual champions Bordeaux.

Decline and Canal+ takeover

The follow-up to the league title was not as glorious though. Key players Luis Fernandez, Jean-Claude Lemoult and Thierry Morin departed ahead of 1986–87 and PSG tried to replace them with more gunpowder up front. Gérard Houllier brought in forwards Vahid Halilhodžić, Daniel Xuereb and Jules Bocandé, all of whom joined Dominique Rocheteau in an extremely attack-minded yet unbalanced squad. The end result was a 7th-place finish in the league, an early exit from the French Cup and a disappointing first European Cup appearance, getting knocked out by Czech minnows Vítkovice in the first round.

PSG's championship-winning team continued to break apart in 1987–88 as Dominique Rocheteau also left the club. World-class midfielders Gabriel Calderón and Ray Wilkins arrived in Paris but could not turn the tide either. Wilkins only played ten matches before joining Rangers in December 1987. Their last-place finish in the Tournoi de Paris, a first since 1976, predicted the way things would unfold. Following a run of seven defeats in eight games, Gérard Houllier took a step back and became the club's sporting director in October 1987.

Erick Mombaerts was named manager but he also failed to steer the ship and PSG finished the year in the relegation zone, prompting Houllier's return in February 1988 for the second half of the campaign. Paris reached its lowest point in late April 1988, when they lost 0–4 against Nice at the Parc des Princes. Still the club's record home league defeat, it plunged them back into third from bottom with only five games remaining. Earlier that month, PSG had also suffered their biggest away cup defeat. It was a 0–3 loss to Sochaux in the French Cup last-32 stage (eliminated 1–6 on aggregate). They rallied up just in time, though, Daniel Xuereb scoring the only goal of the game away to Le Havre on the final matchday to avoid the drop with a dramatic 15th-placed finish. With top-flight status secured, Houllier left the club in June 1988 following the end of the season.

Paris Saint-Germain briefly bounced back from crisis under Tomislav Ivić in 1988–89, fighting for the championship with Marseille. In May 1989, the two sides met for the title decider at the Stade Vélodrome. Played out amid an electric atmosphere, the title looked to be heading to league leaders Paris with the score tied at 0–0 and only a few seconds remaining. But a 25-yard shot from Franck Sauzée surprised PSG goalkeeper Joël Bats as Marseille leapfrogged them at the top of the table to clinch the trophy.

The Parisians returned to their disappointing trend in 1989–90, finishing 5th in the league and putting up a bittersweet performance in the UEFA Cup. They barely defeated lowly Finish outfit Kuusysi in the first round but were then just one goal away from eliminating eventual champions Juventus in the second round. Pre-season saw PSG sign a deal with American sportswear brand Nike as their new kit manufacturer from this campaign onwards, while a young Daniel Bravo joined the club. He would go on to be one of the leading figures of PSG's golden generation in the 1990s. On the other hand, Jean-Marc Pilorget bid farewell after 14 years and a club record 435 appearances.

Poor results, once again showcased by their 9th-place finish in 1990–91, and competition with Racing Paris in the 1980s for recognition as the capital's top team had taken a toll on PSG. The club's budget skyrocketed and, as a result, debt kept rising. In April 1991, after yet another defeat and with the club in great danger of bankruptcy, PSG supporters demanded the resignation of Francis Borelli. In May 1991, following the end of the season, Borelli sold the club to French television giants Canal+. On a bright note, the under-19 side of the PSG Academy won the club's first Coupe Gambardella against Auxerre (1–1; 3–1 on penalties) with future first-team players Pascal Nouma, Bernard Allou and Richard Dutruel leading the squad.

Canal+ years (1991–2006)

Back in European competitions

The takeover by French premium television channel Canal+ revitalised Paris Saint-Germain, whose 40% of its income came from televised games, allowing them to become one of the richest clubs in France. They wiped out PSG's huge 50 million francs debt and appointed Michel Denisot, journalist on the channel, as club president in place of Francis Borelli. This 1991–92 season was also synonymous with the end of the partnership with French radio RTL, the club's historic shirt sponsor since 1974, and the inception of the fan-dedicated Virage Auteuil stand.

PSG were experiencing their worst attendance record since returning to the top flight in 1974, with the violence and racism in the Kop of Boulogne taking the blame for this situation. To give non-violent and non-racist supporters in Boulogne an alternative, as well as boost the attendance levels, Canal+ backed the creation of Auteuil, which until then had been mainly composed of casual spectators and away fans. Encouraged and financed by the club, Lutèce Falco and Supras Auteuil were the first ultra groups of the new stand.

Now enjoying serious investment, PSG were able to set their sights steadily higher; they aimed to immediately qualify for Europe and become French champions within three years. Canal+ increased the club's budget from 90 to 120 million francs in order to build a strong squad. The revolution began with the appointment of renowned coach Artur Jorge, famous for leading Porto to the 1986–87 European Cup trophy, and the departure of eleven players including Jocelyn Angloma, Michel Bibard, Philippe Jeannol and PSG legend Safet Sušić.

The club then embarked on a spending spree, signing Brazilian internationals Ricardo and Valdo, proven French players Paul Le Guen, Laurent Fournier, Bernard Pardo, Bruno Germain and Patrick Colleter, and promising young star David Ginola. Despite criticism over Artur Jorge's solid but unpleasant playing style, PSG managed to achieve the goal set at the beginning of the campaign as they qualified for the UEFA Cup after finishing 3rd in the league. It was a fitting farewell for iconic goalkeeper Joël Bats, who retired at the end of the season.

Third cup title and birth of a rivalry

Led by Bernard Lama, who replaced the recently retired Joël Bats in goal, fellow French talents Alain Roche and Vincent Guérin, and prolific Liberian marksman George Weah, the Red and Blues reached a European semifinal for the first time in their history in 1992–93. After an easy first round against PAOK, PSG defeated Napoli and Anderlecht — two resounding European names but whose best days had already passed — and qualified for the quarterfinals of the UEFA Cup where they were paired with the great Real Madrid.

The Parisians fell to a 3–1 defeat in the first leg at the Santiago Bernabéu Stadium, seriously complicating their chances of qualification. PSG learned their lesson, though, and managed arguably their most famous comeback ever in the second leg. They were 3–0 up in added time with goals from George Weah, David Ginola and Valdo, when the Spanish side pulled one back, momentarily forcing extra time. Paris were given a free kick near Real's area in the final seconds of regular time and Antoine Kombouaré, just like against Anderlecht in the previous round, rose higher than anyone else to send his team to the semifinals with a fantastic header that made him a club legend. PSG supporters nicknamed him "Gold Helmet" after this goal. Unfortunately, PSG's fairy tale ended in the last four against eventual winners Juventus, in the last four.

In France, the capital outfit defeated Nantes in the 1993 Coupe de France Final (3–0), claiming its third cup title overall without conceding a single goal throughout the entire competition, a record only matched by Paris Saint-Germain itself in 2017. Coincidentally, the victory came almost exactly ten years after their last French Cup title in 1983, won against Nantes as well. It was the club's first trophy since 1986 as well as the first of the Canal+ era.

This campaign also marked the beginning of Le Classique, the rivalry between PSG and Marseille, as both teams battled each other on the field for the league crown. The first match, played at the Parc des Princes on December 18, 1992, was so brutal that earned itself the nickname "The Butchery of 1992." It was on this day that the French clásico was born. Artur Jorge announced his side would crush OM, while David Ginola promised war upon them. To motivate his players, Marseille president Bernard Tapie stuck the newspaper articles with PSG's provocations in the dressing room. OM would not disappoint him, walking away with the victory (0–1) in what was an extremely violent match with more than 50 fouls.

In the second match, league leaders Marseille welcomed closest challengers PSG at the Stade Vélodrome in a match that would determine the title. Paris quickly took the lead, only for OM to hit back with three goals and clinch what would have been their fifth consecutive championship (1–3). Shortly after, however, Marseille and Tapie were found guilty of match-fixing. The French Football Federation stripped OM of their trophy and offered it to second-placed PSG, who refused it because Canal+ did not want to anger their subscribers in Marseille. As a result, the 1993 title remains unattributed. Canal+ even refused letting Paris participate in next season's UEFA Champions League after UEFA excluded OM from the competition. Third-placed Monaco took the spot instead. Marseille and their fans have since accused PSG of plotting against them to become the new kings of French football.

Second league title, cup double and European Cup Winners' Cup

Brazilian playmaker Raí, considered by many as PSG's greatest player ever, joined the capital club in 1993–94, helping them conquer their second league title. The Parisians went a remarkable 27 matches without defeat, breaking the Division 1 record set by themselves in 1985–86. PSG also recorded their largest victory ever in all competitions after hammering amateur side Côte Chaude in the last-64 round of the Coupe de France in January 1994 (10–0). The club's league-cup double aspirations were, however, cut short by Lens in the quarterfinals.

In Europe, history would repeat itself. The Red and Blues beat Real Madrid in the European Cup Winners' Cup quarterfinals, becoming in the process the first and, so far, only French team to win at the Bernabéu with a solitary goal from George Weah, but were denied at the gates of the final once again. Having drawn 1–1 at home to Arsenal, PSG needed to score in London yet, surprisingly, Artur Jorge decided to leave Weah in the stands, from where he watched his team lose (0–1). This defeat marked the end of Jorge and his conservative style of play. In his place, the club welcomed Luis Fernandez, who would guide PSG to one of the best campaigns in their history. That defeat notwithstanding, the club were on the move and between 1993 and 1997 they contested two UEFA Cup Winners' Cup finals (in 1996 and 1997), reached the UEFA Champions League semi-finals once and twice advanced to the same stage of the UEFA Cup.

Despite finishing third in the championship, the 1994–95 season was still a success for Paris Saint-Germain. They reached their first UEFA Champions League semi-finals and, above all, clinched both the Coupe de France and Coupe de la Ligue titles for their maiden domestic cup double, granting them access to the 1995–96 edition of the UEFA Cup Winners' Cup, a competition which had already seen Paris rise to the semi-finals in 1994. PSG's crowning glory came with triumph in the 1996 UEFA Cup Winners' Cup Final, Bruno Ngotty hitting the only goal as Rapid Wien were defeated 1–0. A year later, the Parisians finished runners-up to Barcelona in the same competition. On the domestic scene, results were just as satisfying, with PSG celebrating another Ligue 1 title, three French Cups, two French League Cups and just as many French Trophy of Champions wins.

At the time, the players lighting up Parc des Princes were also mainstays of their national sides. Bernard Lama, Alain Roche, Paul Le Guen, Vincent Guérin, David Ginola and Youri Djorkaeff all enjoyed stints with France, while Ricardo, Valdo, Raí and Leonardo were regulars for Brazil. But perhaps the greatest talent of all was prolific Liberian marksman George Weah, who followed in the footsteps of PSG's many fine strikers by firing 55 goals in 137 games.

Decline and revival (1998–2011)

PSG then went into decline following years of mismanagement. The club's form dwindled as they slipped further down the table and eventually, a split from owners Canal+ became inevitable. After years of underachievement, Canal+ sold the club to Colony Capital, Butler Capital Partners and Morgan Stanley in 2006. Colony Capital eventually bought out Morgan Stanley's shares in the club to become 95% owners.

Five more trophies arrived (three French Cups, one League Cup and one UEFA Intertoto Cup) and Parc des Princes faithful also got to marvel at the likes of Marco Simone, Jay-Jay Okocha, Nicolas Anelka, Ronaldinho, Gabriel Heinze, Juan Pablo Sorín, Mario Yepes and Pauleta. However, the club became better known for lurching from one high-profile crisis to another. Indeed, PSG spent the 2006–07 and 2007–08 seasons staving off relegations that were only very narrowly avoided.

During the 2007–08 season, the club only avoided relegation on the final day. PSG struggled throughout the campaign and spent many games in the relegation zone. After a difficult season on and off the pitch, marked by poor results and violence between some fans, PSG avoided relegation to Ligue 2 on the final match after a 2–1 win at Sochaux. The savior was Ivorian striker Amara Diané who scored both PSG goals that night. Today, Diané is still a hero for most Parisian fans.

Domestic hegemony and European ups and downs (2011–present)

Third league title
Paris Saint-Germain were transformed into a top team in 2011, when the club was purchased by Qatar Sports Investments (QSI) after two years of solid progress and stability under the stewardship of manager Antoine Kombouaré and president Robin Leproux. The takeover made PSG not only the richest club in France but one of the wealthiest in the world. QSI and new club president Nasser Al-Khelaifi pledged to form a team capable of winning the UEFA Champions League and making the club France's biggest name.

Club legend Leonardo was brought back in a sporting director capacity and oversaw a spending spree in summer 2011 that has so far been unprecedented in Ligue 1 history. Despite finishing behind Montpellier in 2011–12, the elusive league crown was finally brought back to Paris in 2012–13 driven by star player Zlatan Ibrahimović, team captain Thiago Silva and famous manager Carlo Ancelotti. Zlatan's 30-goal haul almost single-handedly led the capital side to its first Ligue 1 title in 19 years, and third overall. However, PSG were unlucky to be eliminated from the UEFA Champions League on away goals Barcelona in the quarter-finals after drawing both games.

National quadruples and European breakthrough

Big money signings continued with the arrivals of Edinson Cavani in 2013 and David Luiz in 2014. Despite the departure of Carlo Ancelotti, PSG kept its winning ways under Laurent Blanc. The club secured a maiden domestic treble (Ligue 1, Coupe de la Ligue and Trophée des Champions) in the 2013–14 season, before claiming an unprecedented national quadruple (Ligue 1, Coupe de France, Coupe de la Ligue and Trophée des Champions) twice in a row in 2014–15 and 2015–16. However, Blanc's teams were never able to advance past the quarterfinals of the UEFA Champions League, a goal that president Nasser Al-Khelaifi and ownership group QSI made clear was the ultimate benchmark for the club's success.

Fresh from three consecutive UEFA Europa League titles with Sevilla, Unai Emery was hired by PSG for his European pedigree. But with star player Zlatan Ibrahimović gone, the club endured a disappointing 2016–17 season. Paris were pipped to the Ligue 1 title by Monaco, missing out on top spot for the first time in five years. Additionally, PSG surrendered a 4–0 first-leg lead over Barcelona with a historic 6–1 thrashing at Camp Nou in the last 16 of the UEFA Champions League. Nevertheless, they secured another domestic cup treble, claiming the Trophée des Champions, the Coupe de la Ligue and the Coupe de France. 

In response, PSG assembled a fearsome attacking trio composed of Edinson Cavani and world-record signings Neymar and Kylian Mbappé in the 2017–18 campaign. The capital club reclaimed the Ligue 1 title and successfully defended the three cups, clinching the domestic quadruple for the third time in four seasons. But, with Parisian fans promised European glory in light of their massive expenditure, these victories on the national stage were not enough after their UEFA Champions League exit at the hands of Real Madrid in the round of 16. As a result, Unai Emery left the club at the end of the season. 

Paris Saint-Germain again fell in the Champions League round of 16 in the 2018–19 season, suffering a shock 3–1 defeat at home to Manchester United after winning the first leg 2–0 at Old Trafford. This season, they won the Ligue 1 for the 8th time in their history, but lost in the Coupe de France Final against Rennes. PSG were eliminated from the Coupe de la Ligue in embarrassing fashion, as they lost 2–1 at home to Guingamp in the quarterfinals. However, the team defeated the same opposition by a margin of 9–0 ten days later in the league.

In the 2019–20 season, PSG won the Ligue 1 title for the 9th time in their history, following the title being awarded to them based on PPG ratio as the season was ended prematurely due to the COVID-19 pandemic. Once the lockdown ended, they also reclaimed the Coupe de France after defeating Saint-Étienne in the final, and the last-ever Coupe de la Ligue with a penalty shootout win over Lyon in the final on 31 July. In the 2019–20 UEFA Champions League, PSG reached the semi-finals for the second time since 1995, after a 2–1 win over Atalanta, and then reached its first-ever final by defeating RB Leipzig 3–0. In a tightly contested final, PSG lost to Bayern Munich 1–0. In the 2020–21 season, PSG won the Coupe de France, but failed to retain the Ligue 1 title. However, the club did make the semi-finals of the Champions League for the second time in a row, notably eliminating Barcelona and Bayern Munich before falling short of the final at the hands of Manchester City.

Ahead of the 2021–22 season, Paris Saint-Germain completed the signings of seven players; Gianluigi Donnarumma, Achraf Hakimi, Nuno Mendes, Lionel Messi, Danilo Pereira, Sergio Ramos, and Georginio Wijnaldum. The club's summer transfer window was considered by many observers as one of the greatest in football history, with four of the seven players joining on free transfers. Later in the season, PSG went on to reclaim the Ligue 1 title, but fell short in the Champions League at the hands of Real Madrid in the round of 16, a tie amplified by the uncertainty surrounding Kylian Mbappé's future. However, on 21 May 2022, Mbappé extended his contract with PSG until 2025, despite speculations of a possible transfer to Real Madrid, which prompted La Liga officials to file a complaint to UEFA regarding accumulating losses of PSG in the previous years.

Unsatisfied with the club direction and lack of European success club president Nasser Al-Khelaifi promised mega-changes heading into next season and stated the team would not win the UEFA Champions League as currently constructed. This was in an interview with Le Parisien. Changes were needed at the club on a very deep level and as such during the pre season for the 2022–23 season the club embarked on an ambitious rebuild. This began with the hiring of transfer market expert Luis Campos who made his name at Monaco first and then Lille. Campos made his name as sporting director at Monaco from 2013 to 2016. He oversaw the transfers of Radamel Falcao, João Moutinho, James Rodríguez, Fabinho, Anthony Martial, Bernardo Silva and Thomas Lemar amongst others. A change in club ethos was noted and this was followed by the sacking of first team coach Pochetino while an announcement for the hiring of Christophe Galtier was made in quick succession. A busy pre-season followed with a new transfer policy of "No bling-bling", the club quickly signed Nuno Mendes, Vitinha, Hugo Ekitike and Nordi Mukiele. Meanwhile a lot of older players who were not committed to the project were transfer listed.

References

External links
Official websites
PSG.FR - Site officiel du Paris Saint-Germain
Paris Saint-Germain - Ligue 1
Paris Saint-Germain - UEFA.com

Paris Saint-Germain F.C.
P